
Gmina Goszczanów is a rural gmina (administrative district) in Sieradz County, Łódź Voivodeship, in central Poland.

Villages
Gmina Goszczanów contains the villages and settlements of Chlewo, Chwalęcice, Czerniaków, Gawłowice, Goszczanów, Karolina, Kaszew, Klonów, Lipicze Górne, Lipicze Olendry, Lipicze W, Poniatów, Poniatówek, Poprężniki, Poradzew, Rzężawy, Sokołów, Stojanów, Strachanów, Sulmów, Sulmówek, Świnice Kaliskie, Wacławów, Waliszewice, Wilczków, Wilkszyce, Wola Tłomakowa, Wroniawy and Ziemięcin.

Neighbouring gminas
Gmina Goszczanów is bordered by the gminas of Błaszki, Dobra, Kawęczyn, Koźminek, Lisków, Szczytniki and Warta.

References
Polish official population figures 2006

Goszczanow
Sieradz County